This is a list of years in Belarus.  For only articles about years in Belarus that have been written, see :Category:Years in Belarus.

Twenty-first century

Twentieth century

Nineteenth century

See also 
 Timeline of Minsk
 List of years by country

Further reading

External links
 

 
Belarus history-related lists
Belarus